The International Center of Advanced Racing (Circuit ICAR) is a multi-track facility located on the former runways at Montréal–Mirabel International Airport, in Mirabel, Quebec, Canada north of Montreal. The facility features a 2.125-mile (3.4 km), 16-turn road course, a 0.4 mile oval, a quarter-mile (0.4 km) drag strip, two kart tracks, a driftpark and an offroad course.

The facility opened in May 2008 as a private motorsport country club, and was opened to the general public in 2009 with the opening of the ICAR Racing Academy, and a karting track designed by Formula One World Champion Jacques Villeneuve.

Circuit ICAR now hosts weekly drag racing events, lapping nights, car clubs and major Canadian race series including the Canadian Touring Car Championship and the NASCAR Pinty's Series.

Current series
 NASCAR Pinty's Series
 NASCAR Sportsman
 NASCAR Sport Compacte
 NASCAR Légendes Modifiées
 Canadian Touring Car Championship
 Canadian Supercar
 Sportsman ICAR Challenge
 Formula Tour 1600
 Pro-Cam
 Super Production Challenge
 Drift Mania Canadian Championship

Former series
Canadian Superbike Championship
IMSA GT3 Cup Challenge Canada

NASCAR Oval Track Record

NASCAR race winners

See also
 List of auto racing tracks in Canada
 Other Montreal area race tracks
 Circuit Gilles Villeneuve
 Circuit Mont-Tremblant
 Sanair Super Speedway

Footnotes

External links
Official Site
Circuit ICAR race results at Racing-Reference
ICAR Le Club
NASCAR Track Page

Road racing venues in Canada
Motorsport venues in Quebec
Motorsport in Canada
NASCAR tracks
Sports venues in Quebec
Montréal–Mirabel International Airport